Theodore Stark Wilkinson (December 18, 1847 – February 1, 1921) was a member of the U. S. House of Representatives representing the state of Louisiana.  He served two terms as a Democrat. After leaving office, he was appointed collector of the U.S. Custom House at New Orleans by President Grover Cleveland.

Wilkinson was born on the Point Celeste plantation in Plaquemines Parish. As an adult, he owned the largest sugar plantations in lower Plaquemines, with one encompassing nine miles of Mississippi River riverfront.  He also ran unsuccessfully for governor of Louisiana in 1908.  He died from heart failure in New Orleans on February 1, 1921.

His great-grandfather was James Wilkinson, the scandalous first governor of the Louisiana Territory who was later exposed as a paid spy for the Spanish Empire. He was also the uncle of another Theodore Stark Wilkinson who would become vice-admiral of the United States Navy during World War II.

References

External links 
Biography at Congress.gov

1847 births
1921 deaths
Washington and Lee University alumni
Democratic Party members of the United States House of Representatives from Louisiana
People from Plaquemines Parish, Louisiana